James Lowther, 1st Earl of Lonsdale (5 August 173624 May 1802) was an English country landowner and politician who sat in the House of Commons for 27 years from 1757 to 1784, when he was raised to the Peerage of Great Britain as Earl of Lonsdale.

Life

The son of Robert Lowther of Maulds Meaburn, Westmorland, and Catherine Pennington, he was educated at Peterhouse, Cambridge.

He succeeded his father in 1745 to the baronetcy and the estates, including Lowther Hall, owned by his great-uncle Henry Lowther, 3rd Viscount Lonsdale, on 6 March 1751. This inheritance included the Christchurch Plantation, a slave plantation in Barbados. He also inherited the estates of Sir William Lowther, 3rd Baronet, of Marske on 15 April 1756 and the estates of his cousin Sir James Lowther, 4th Baronet, of Whitehaven in 1755.

Lowther exercised influence over a number of "rotten" or "pocket" boroughs, including Appleby, a classic example of this type of constituency. In 1761 he was credited with securing the return of eight MPs—two each for Cumberland, Westmorland, and Cockermouth, and one each for Appleby and Carlisle. Later, in 1781, he secured the election of William Pitt the Younger as member for Appleby.

He married Mary Crichton-Stuart, daughter of John Stuart, 3rd Earl of Bute, and Mary Wortley-Montagu, 1st Baroness Mount Stuart, on 7 September 1761 and had a string of mistresses. He fell in love with the daughter of one of his tenants and made her his mistress keeping her in luxury. When she died he could not endure to have her buried and the body remained lying in bed until the increasing putrefaction became unbearable. He then had her body placed in a glass topped coffin that was placed in a cupboard. Eventually her body was buried in Paddington cemetery.

He was created Earl of Lonsdale on 24 May 1784 and Viscount Lowther on 26 October 1797, with special remainder to his third cousin Sir William Lowther, 2nd Baronet, of Little Preston.

On 9 June 1792 he fought a duel with a Captain Cuthbert of the Guards, when the latter refused to let the former's carriage pass through Mount Street in London where some rioting had been taking place. The Earl asked him if he knew who he was which this led to an unpleasant exchange of words following which the Earl felt obliged to challenge the Captain to a duel the next morning. A pistol ball passed through the flap of Cuthbert's coat but after the exchange of fire both men were unhurt. The matter was concluded with a handshake. In January 1798, he found another duel with Sir Frederick Fletcher-Vane in Hyde Park. 

He was variously known as "Wicked Jimmy", the "Bad Earl", the "Gloomy Earl" and "Jimmy" or "Jemmy Grasp-all, Earl of Toadstool".

Death and succession
He died in 1802, having had no children by his wife. His earldom and baronetcy became extinct but he was succeeded as Viscount Lowther, according to the special remainder, by his third cousin William Lowther, 2nd Viscount Lowther, who was later (1807) advanced to Earl of Lonsdale of the second creation. The latter, a coal magnate, also inherited Lowther Castle, which he rebuilt between 1806 and 1814.

The Earl and the Wordsworth family
Lowther had accumulated debts to his solicitor, John Wordsworth, the father of William Wordsworth. Although Wordsworth worked for Lowther, Lowther never paid Wordsworth for his various expenses, which amounted to £4,000 from 1763 until Wordsworth's death in 1783. This debt was finally discharged after his death by his successor.

Notes

References 
Lowther pedigree 2

External links 

|-

|-

|-

|-

1736 births
1802 deaths
English landowners
James
1
Peers of Great Britain created by George III
Lord-Lieutenants of Cumberland
Lord-Lieutenants of Westmorland
Lowther, James
British MPs 1754–1761
British MPs 1761–1768
British MPs 1768–1774
British MPs 1774–1780
British MPs 1780–1784